WATC may refer to:

 WATC-DT, a television station (channel 34, virtual 57) licensed to serve Atlanta, Georgia, United States
 Wichita Area Technical College
 Western Arkansas Technical Center
 Washington Terminal Company (reporting mark WATC)
 "We Are the Champions" a 1977 Queen Song
 Weekend All Things Considered, U.S. weekend news program from National Public Radio

In Western Australia:
 Western Australian Turf Club, Thoroughbred racing club of WA
 Western Australian Tourist Commission, WA government agency
 Western Australian Treasury Corporation, WA Government public sector financial service